is a Japanese former professional footballer who played as a defensive midfielder. He played 53 times for Japan between 2005 and 2011 and was a member of the 2010 FIFA World Cup squad.

Club career

JEF United Chiba
Born in Ichikawa, Chiba, Abe, then a member of the JEF United Ichihara (now JEF United Chiba) youth side, made his debut with the senior club at the age of 16 years and 333 days on 5 August 1998, at the time a record for the youngest Japanese professional player and J1 League. He went on to become JEF United's captain, and led the club to the 2005 and 2006 J.League Cup titles while being named to the league's Best Eleven during the span.

Urawa Reds

On 22 January 2007, Abe joined Urawa Reds, the defending J1 League and Emperor's Cup champions, for a transfer fee of around ¥360 million (around $3 million), a record amount for a Japanese player in a domestic deal.

Abe helped Urawa Reds to win the 2007 AFC Champions League. He scored once in the second leg of the final against Iran's Sepahan FC. Abe participated in the 2007 Club World Cup playing for Urawa who eventually lost to AC Milan. Urawa finished in third place.

Leicester City

On 26 August 2010, Abe was signed by English Championship club Leicester City, signing a three-year contract. He made his debut in a 2-1 league win over Cardiff City on 14 September, scoring his first goal for the club in a 4-2 win over Ipswich Town on 7 May 2011. His last league goal for the club was in a 1-0 win over Brighton on 17 September 2011. Suffering from homesickness, Abe's contract was cancelled by mutual consent on 22 January 2012 and he returned to Japan to re-join former club Urawa Reds.

Urawa Reds
In 2012, Abe returned to Urawa Reds. He played all matches in J1 League except for one match in 2013 season until 2016 season. In 2016, Reds won the champions in J.League Cup and the 2nd place in J1 League. He was also selected Best Eleven award. In 2017, Reds won the champions in AFC Champions League for the first time in 10 years. In 2018, Reds won the Emperor's Cup.

On 14 November 2021, Abe announced that he would retire from football at the end of the 2021 season.

International career
Abe made his senior national team debut on 29 January 2005, in a friendly match against Kazakhstan and scored his first national team goal on 6 September 2006 against Yemen in a 2007 Asian Cup qualification match. He was not selected to Japan's 2006 World Cup team, but he has become a regular under his former JEF United coach Ivica Osim, who took over as the national team head coach after the World Cup. He had previously represented Japan at the Under-20 and Under-23 levels, appearing in all three first round matches at the 2004 Olympics and scoring a goal against Italy.
He appeared in all of Japan's games at the 2010 World Cup. Despite missing out on Japan's 2011 Asian Cup victory, on 29 March 2011 he played 45 minutes against the J-League All Stars. On 4 August 2011 Abe was announced in the Japan squad to play South Korea. He played 53 games and scored 3 goals for Japan until 2011.

Career statistics

Club

International

Scores and results list Japan's goal tally first, score column indicates score after each Abe goal.

Honours
JEF United Chiba
J.League Cup: 2005, 2006

Urawa Red Diamonds
AFC Champions League: 2007, 2017
J.League Cup: 2016
Suruga Bank Championship: 2017
Emperor's Cup: 2018

Individual
J.League Best Eleven: 2005, 2006, 2007, 2016
J.League Cup New Hero Award: 2005

References

External links

 
 
 
 
 
 Japan National Football Team Database

1981 births
Living people
Association football people from Chiba Prefecture
Japanese footballers
Association football midfielders
Japan international footballers
J1 League players
English Football League players
JEF United Chiba players
Urawa Red Diamonds players
Leicester City F.C. players
Footballers at the 2002 Asian Games
Medalists at the 2002 Asian Games
Asian Games medalists in football
Asian Games silver medalists for Japan
Olympic footballers of Japan
Footballers at the 2004 Summer Olympics
2007 AFC Asian Cup players
2010 FIFA World Cup players
Japanese expatriate footballers
Japanese expatriate sportspeople in England
Expatriate footballers in England